was a  after Chōkyō and before Meio. This period spanned the years from August 1489 through July 1492.

Change of era
 1489 : The era name was changed to mark an event or a number of events. The old era ended and a new one commenced in Chōkyō 3.

Events of the Entoku era
 April 26, 1489 (Entoku 1, 26th day of the 3rd month): The shōgun Yoshihisa died at age 25 while leading a military campaign in Ōmi Province. He had led the shogunate for 18 years. His father, the former Shogun Yoshimasa, was strongly afflicted by his death; and because of this unanticipated development, he was moved to reconcile with his brother, Yoshimi.
 January 27, 1490 (Entoku 2, 7th day of the 1st month): The former shōgun Yoshimasa died at age 56.
 1490 (Entoku 2, 7th month): Ashikaga Yoshimura (known as Ashikaga Yoshitane after 1501), nephew of Yoshimasa, is proclaimed as shōgun at age 25.

Notes

References
 Nussbaum, Louis Frédéric and Käthe Roth. (2005). Japan Encyclopedia. Cambridge: Harvard University Press. ; OCLC 48943301
 Titsingh, Isaac. (1834). Nihon Ōdai Ichiran; ou,  Annales des empereurs du Japon.  Paris: Royal Asiatic Society, Oriental Translation Fund of Great Britain and Ireland. OCLC 5850691.

External links
 National Diet Library, "The Japanese Calendar" – historical overview plus illustrative images from library's collection

Japanese eras
1480s in Japan
1490s in Japan